Alder Dam is a concrete thick arch dam on the Nisqually River in the U.S. state of Washington. The construction began in 1942 and was completed in 1945. At this time Alder Dam was among the tallest dams in the United States, although this title has since been surpassed. With  of shoreline, the lake is a popular recreation spot close to Mount Rainier National Park.

Water from Alder Lake is sent into two generators at the base of the dam, each of which produces 25 megawatts for a total nameplate capacity of 50 megawatts. Two miles downstream is LaGrande Dam, site of the first dam in the area, dating from 1912, and rebuilt in 1945 along with Alder's construction. Both Alder and LaGrande dams are owned and operated by Tacoma Power.

The name of the lake and the dam recalls the former small town of Alder, which was flooded in 1945 by the impounded water of the lake and disappeared. The current community of Alder is located north of the reservoir.

References

Dams in Washington (state)
United States power company dams
Hydroelectric power plants in Washington (state)
Buildings and structures in Pierce County, Washington
Buildings and structures in Thurston County, Washington
Dams completed in 1945
Energy infrastructure completed in 1945
Tacoma Public Utilities